Demon's Delight is an anthology novel containing four short stories written by authors MaryJanice Davidson, Emma Holly, Vickie Taylor, and Catherine Spangler.

Novellas

Witch Way
Chris Mere is the descendant of a long line of witches that were cursed in the times of the Salem Witch Trials. The curse causes each generation to pick one descendant and it is his job to kill the witch hunter who comes to destroy the de Mere family. Rhea Goodman is the witch hunter that is destined to kill the next descendant of the de Mere line. Rather than killing Rhea, Chris approaches her days after she discovers her destiny to try to stop the cycle of violence before they become the next dead descendants of their family lines. Witch Way is written by MaryJanice Davidson.

Street Corners and Halos
Written by Catherine Spangler.

The Demon's Angel
Written by Emma Holly.

Angel and the Hellraiser
Written by Vickie Taylor

External links
 MaryJanice Davidson's Official website
 Emma Holly's Official website
 Vickie Taylor's Official website
 Catherine Spangler's Official website

2007 American novels
American romance novels
American novellas
Novels by MaryJanice Davidson
Berkley Books books